Luka Pisačić (born 29 August 1997) is a Croatian professional football who plays as a forward for Austrian club DSV Leoben.

Career
Born in Croatian capital Zagreb, Pisačić began his professional senior career in Austria playing with reserves team of SV Mattersburg. He also played with SV Lafnitz in Austrian Football Second League before moving to Serbia in summer 2020 and signing with OFK Bačka in 2020–21 Serbian SuperLiga.

On 9 August 2021, he signed with Opava in the Czech Republic.

References

External links
 

1997 births
Living people
Footballers from Zagreb
Association football forwards
Croatian footballers
SV Mattersburg players
SV Lafnitz players
OFK Bačka players
SFC Opava players
DSV Leoben players
Austrian Regionalliga players
2. Liga (Austria) players
Serbian SuperLiga players
Czech National Football League players
Croatian expatriate footballers
Expatriate footballers in Austria
Croatian expatriate sportspeople in Austria
Expatriate footballers in Serbia
Croatian expatriate sportspeople in Serbia
Expatriate footballers in the Czech Republic
Croatian expatriate sportspeople in the Czech Republic